Sheikha Alia bint Khalifa bin Saeed Al Maktoum is the widow of Sheikh Maktoum bin Rashid Al Maktoum. They were married from 12 March 1971 until his death in 2006.

Sheikha Alia, like other members of the Maktoum family, is involved in horse racing. In 2005, she purchased four horses. Her horse Eilean Ban won the EBF Fillies' Conditions Stakes on September 2, 2005, at the Newmarket Racecourse.

References

Alia Bint Khalifa Bin Saeed Al
People from Dubai
Year of birth missing (living people)
Living people
Spouses of prime ministers of the United Arab Emirates
Emirati racehorse owners and breeders
20th-century Emirati people